The St. Petersburg Museum of History (SPMOH) is a history museum located in St. Petersburg, Florida, dedicated to covering the area's history. , the museum's director is Rui Farias.

The museum was founded by Mary Wheeler Eaton in 1920 as the St. Petersburg Memorial Historical Society. The city of St. Petersburg granted the organization the site after the 1921 Tampa Bay hurricane destroyed the aquarium standing on the land. It is the oldest museum in Pinellas County. The mission of the museum is to collect, preserve, and communicate the history and heritage of Florida with an emphasis on St. Petersburg and the Pinellas peninsula. The museum hosts a variety of traveling exhibits, evening events, guest speakers, and more. The St. Petersburg Museum of History has a significant archive that includes over 5,000 indexed city photographs, 32,000 artifacts, and other historic photos and documents.

Notable holdings include a plus-sized pair of pajamas owned by William Howard Taft; a full-sized replica of the Benoist XIV aircraft; reading glasses owned by George Armstrong Custer; and the largest collection of signed baseballs in the world (called "Little Cooperstown").

Due to the COVID-19 pandemic, the museum was closed from March 2020 through July 8, 2020. The pandemic also derailed plans for actor Tom Hanks to sign the 5,000th baseball in the museum's collection.

The museum is set to expand; artist Ya La’ford, is creating an aluminum sculpture called Intersections to wrap around the new building expansion.

References

External links
St. Petersburg Museum of History website

1920 establishments in Florida
History museums in Florida
Museums established in 1920
Museums in St. Petersburg, Florida
History of St. Petersburg, Florida